Talus Taylor (1933 – 19 February 2015) was an American writer of children's literature, best known for being the co-creator with his wife Annette Tison of the Barbapapa series.

Taylor was born in 1933 in San Francisco. He was a biology teacher and the companion of Annette Tison, the co-creator of the famous Barbapapa series; initially published as an album in 1970, before becoming a cartoon and a magazine in 1976. Taylor died on 19th February 2015 in Paris at the age of 82.

References 

American child writers
1933 births
2015 deaths
People from San Francisco
Writers from San Francisco
20th-century American male writers